Li Jinyu (born 6 July 1977) is a former international player who is currently the head coach of Wuhan. 

As a player he represented Liaoning Whowin and Shandong Luneng in the Chinese Super League and spent one season on loan at French club AS Nancy. He is also currently the top goalscorer in Chinese professional league history and won the Golden Boot Award three times in the process.

Club career
One of the premier strikers in China, Li Jinyu earned his reputation early when he was the stars of the Chinese youth team that studied in Brazil for a training programme sponsored by Shenzhen Jianlibao. This then saw him called up to the Chinese under-20 national team and gave him a chance to play in the 1997 FIFA World Youth Championship which attracted the interests of French side AS Nancy who acquired him on loan for one season. Li's time at AS Nancy was not successful and he would return to China to sign with Liaoning Whowin, immediately showing his potential that was missing at AS Nancy when he became an integral member of the team that narrowly lost out on the league title in 1999. While he would personally win his first Golden Boot award in 2002, he did not win any trophies with his club Liaoning during his time with them.

At the beginning of the 2004 league season, Shandong Luneng were willing to pay 4,900,000 yuan to make him the most expensive signing in Chinese football transfer history at the time. He would immediately become an integral member of the team and would repay them by helping them win the Chinese FA Cup and Chinese Super League Cup at the end of the season. The 2006 league season would see him reach his peak when he won the league title, the Chinese FA Cup, and the Golden Boot award with the team. The 2007 league season would see him officially become the most prolific player within the league when he broke Hao Haidong's goal record, however he could not aid Shandong to another league title. Despite his tradition in scoring, his prolific goalscoring dropped during the 2008 league season when he only scored six goals, nevertheless he was still able to win another league title. By the 2010 league season, Li would become a fringe player within the team, however he would still go on to win the league title once more and decided to retire at the end of the season.

International career
After playing in the 1997 FIFA World Youth Championship for the Chinese under-20 national team, Li would immediately move to the senior team and would make his debut in a friendly against the United States in a 1-1 draw on 1 February 1997. This then saw him become a regular with the Chinese national team and saw him play in several unsuccessful World Cup qualifiers. His biggest achievement came in the 2004 AFC Asian Cup where he was an integral member of the team that was runners-up in the tournament. When China qualified for the 2007 AFC Asian Cup, then manager Zhu Guanghu dropped him from the squad to take part in the tournament because he believed that his performances were not convincing enough to be included in the squad.

Management career
Li started his managerial career by becoming the assistant coach of the Chinese women's national team and Shenyang Shenbei. On 13 May 2013, he was appointed as the new manager of China League One side Shenyang Shenbei, replacing Liu Zhicai who was sacked from the club on the same day after a string of poor results.

Career statistics

Club

International goals

Management statistics

Honours

Player

Club
Shandong Luneng
Chinese Super League: 2006, 2008, 2010
Chinese FA Cup: 2004, 2006
Chinese Super League Cup: 2004

International
China PR national football team
 East Asian Football Championship: 2005

Individual
Chinese Super League Top goalscorer: 2006, 2007
Chinese Super League Team of the Year: 2002, 2004, 2006, 2007

See also
List of football records in China

References

External links

Player Stats

1977 births
Living people
Footballers from Shenyang
Association football forwards
Chinese footballers
Chinese football managers
China international footballers
2004 AFC Asian Cup players
Chinese expatriate footballers
Liaoning F.C. players
AS Nancy Lorraine players
Expatriate footballers in France
Ligue 1 players
Chinese Super League players
Shandong Taishan F.C. players
Asian Games medalists in football
Footballers at the 1998 Asian Games
Asian Games bronze medalists for China
Medalists at the 1998 Asian Games
Cangzhou Mighty Lions F.C. managers
Jiangsu F.C. managers
wuhan F.C. managers
Chinese Super League managers